Sloanea lepida is a species of plant in the Elaeocarpaceae family. It is endemic to New Caledonia.

References

Endemic flora of New Caledonia
lepida
Vulnerable plants
Taxonomy articles created by Polbot